William J. Prendergast IV is a United States Army officer and Major General who serves as Commander, Contingency Command Post 1 and Task Force 51 of United States Army North. He also served as the Deputy Commanding General of U.S. Army Africa (USAFRICOM) as well as the Army Reserve Component Integration Advisor for the unit.

He began his military career in Oregon where he eventually commanded the armed forces of the state (the National Guard of Oregon) and served as in a variety of senior administrative positions.

Early life and education 
Prendergast attended Bates College in Lewiston, Maine and graduated in 1990 with a degree in political science. He went on to be awarded a master's in Strategic Studies from the United States Army War College.

Military career

Early career in Oregon 

Prendergast was commissioned in 1994 after attending the Oregon Military Academy's National Guard Officer Candidate School. During his time in Oregon, he commanded the 41st Infantry Brigade Combat Team as well as various other units including the 249th Regional Training Institute, Camp Umatilla Oregon, the 82nd Support Detachment (ROC) (TSC), the 1-82nd Cavalry, the 1-82nd Cavalry, the Joint Forces Headquarters Oregon, and the 1-162nd Infantry.  In April 2017, Prendergast was selected as assistant adjutant general, serving at the Oregon Joint Force Headquarters in Salem, Oregon.

As deputy commander of U.S. Army Africa 

It was announced by U.S. Army Africa in Vicenza, Italy that Prendergast was chosen to succeed as the deputy commander of the unit effective July 11, 2017.

On July 17, 2017, Prendergast halted military work in recognition of Nelson Mandela Day and partnered with local South African animal shelters and troops to provide free medical treatment to dogs who spread disease throughout the city of Postmasburg as a way of "giving back to the community".

Due to ongoing attacks on U.N. peace keeping missions in South Africa, his unit assembled (along with the South African National Defence Force), a task force utilized for the sole purpose of repelling invading para-military terrorists from the Democratic Republic of Congo, South Sudan, Iraq and Afghanistan. He began military training with both teams in early July 2017 describing them as "strengthen[ing] military cooperation between the two countries."

He officially took command of specialized American military forces in South Africa with a delivery of 31,000 MREs (meals ready to eat), and instructed the 800 U.S. soldiers in the area to begin on-site reconnaissance on August 1, 2017.

In July 2021, he was nominated for promotion to major general. He was confirmed on July 29, 2021, and was promoted on December 23, 2021.

Awards and honors 
The following table denotes the awards, medals, and honors received by Prendergast as of July 2017 according to the U.S. Army:

References 

Bates College alumni
Living people
Military personnel from Oregon
United States Army generals
Year of birth missing (living people)